Demon Lord, Retry! is an anime series adapted from the light novel of the same title written by Kurone Kanzaki. The series is directed by Hiroshi Kimura at Ekachi Epilka, with Ōka Tanisaki writing the scripts, and Chiyo Nakayama designing the characters. It aired from July 4 to September 19, 2019 on Tokyo MX and BS Fuji. The series is directed by Hiroshi Kimura, with Ōka Tanisaki handled the series composition, and Chiyo Nakayama designed the characters. The opening theme is "Tempest" performed by Kaori Ishihara and the ending theme is "New" performed by Haruka Tōjō. Funimation has licensed the series.


Episode List

Notes

References

Demon Lord, Retry!